Sivuqaq, also known as Jocko, was a Pacific walrus at the Six Flags Discovery Kingdom in Vallejo, California. He was the subject of several television and radio programmes,. Some of which focussed on the steps his keepers took to encourage him to mate successfully. He was one of a number of walrus calves brought to Vallejo in 1994; the three others were the females Qiluk, Uquq, and Siku. They were orphaned as the result of hunting near the city of Gambell, Alaska,. Gambell's name in Yupik "Sivuqaq" inspired his name. He died in 2015.

Research
Sivuqaq was the subject of research on the vocalisation, reproductive habits, and cognition of walruses.

Acting career
Sivuqaq appeared as Jocko in 50 First Dates.

References

External links
 https://www.nytimes.com/2008/05/20/health/20iht-20walrusbr.13033370.html

1994 animal births
2015 animal deaths
Individual animals in the United States
Individual walruses